The 1906 Maine gubernatorial election took place on September 10, 1906.

Incumbent Republican Governor William T. Cobb was re-elected to a second term in office, defeating Democratic candidate Cyrus W. Davis.

Results

Notes

References

Gubernatorial
1906
Maine
September 1906 events